Copy and paste is a method for digital transfer of text or other data in computing

Copy and paste may also refer to:
 "Copy, Paste", a song by American rapper Diggy Simmons
 Copy & Paste (album), a repackaged version of Hurricane Venus by South Korean artist BoA

See also
 Copypasta
 Cut and paste (disambiguation)